Lauritz Johan Riise  (2 August 1910 – 30 April 1978) was a Norwegian politician.

He was born in Sortland to Lauritz Johan Riise Sr. and Julie Berg. He was elected representative to the Storting for the period 1954–1957 for the Conservative Party.

References

1910 births
1978 deaths
People from Sortland
Conservative Party (Norway) politicians
Members of the Storting